Thomas Hodgins,  (October 6, 1828 – 1910) was an Ontario, Canada lawyer and political figure. He represented Elgin West in the Legislative Assembly of Ontario as a Liberal member from 1871 to 1878.

Born in Dublin, Ireland in 1828, he went to Toronto to the province of Canada West in 1848. He studied at the University of Toronto and was called to the bar in 1858. In the same year, he married Maria, the daughter of John Scoble. He was named Queen's Counsel in 1873. In 1878, he took part in the discussions with the federal government which established the northern and western boundaries of the province of Ontario. In the same year, he resigned his seat in the Ontario legislature to run, unsuccessfully, in the federal riding of West Toronto. He contributed to the Upper Canada Law Journal and also published a number of works on the subject of law.

His brother John George Hodgins served as deputy minister in the Ontario Ministry of Education.

External links 

The Canadian biographical dictionary and portrait gallery of eminent and self-made men (1880)

1828 births
1910 deaths
Canadian King's Counsel
Irish emigrants to pre-Confederation Ontario
Ontario Liberal Party MPPs
Politicians from Toronto
Immigrants to the Province of Canada